ACTCOM (Active Communications Ltd.) was an Israeli Internet service provider  (ISP).

History 

The firm was established in 1992 by Amir Plivatsky and Ayelet Holder. Actcom was the first such companies in Israel and one of the first in the world. It began providing access to the business sector. Among its customer were leading Israeli hi-tech companies.

In 1995, Actcom started to provide consumer Internet access.

The company provided other communication services including web hosting and intranets to corporations and other organizations.

Actcom supported Open Source and Free Software and the Israel Open Source community.

After 15 years of activity the company was purchased by Bezeq International in 2007. During the period the company was located in Haifa.

Sources 
 
 
 

Internet service providers of Israel